The Governor Greene Cemetery, frequently called the Governor Greene Lot, is designated as Rhode Island Historical Cemetery, Warwick, #40, and is a late colonial cemetery located in Warwick, Rhode Island near the East Greenwich town line.  It is a family cemetery with the graves of two Rhode Island governors (father and son), and other prominent politicians who are related to them.

Description 

The Governor Greene Cemetery, is located on Love Lane in Warwick, Rhode Island,Warwick Digital History Project and is a small family cemetery with only 43 known interments (plus a family dog).  The first known interment was in 1741, and the last was in 1993, though the cemetery may still be in use.  Four prominent people are buried here, each the son of the preceding person:
 William Greene (1695–1758), Rhode Island colonial governor for 11 years
 William Greene (1731–1809), Rhode Island governor during the American Revolutionary War
 Ray Greene (1765–1849), United States Senator and Rhode Island Attorney General
 William Greene (1797–1883), Rhode Island lieutenant governor shortly after the Civil War

Also buried here:
 Catharine (Ray) Greene (1731–1794), the wife of Governor William Greene, a long-time correspondent of Benjamin Franklin

Image gallery

References 

1741 establishments in Rhode Island
Cemeteries in Rhode Island
Buildings and structures in Warwick, Rhode Island
Greene family of Rhode Island